Blondet is a surname that it may refer to:

 Francis Blondet (born 1945), French diplomat
 Giselle Blondet (born 1964), Puerto Rican actress and TV host
 Héctor Blondet (1947–2006), Puerto Rican basketball player
 Jean-Philippe Blondet, executive chef of the Alain Ducasse at the Dorchester, a three-Michelin-star restaurant, since 2016
 Emile Blondet, a character in La Comédie humaine by Honoré de Balzac